Han Hyun-min (born 19 May 2001) is a South Korean-Nigerian model and actor, who gained national recognition by becoming the first Korean model of African descent to walk the catwalks in South Korea and internationally.

Early life
Han was born in 2001 to a Nigerian father and a Korean mother from the Cheongju Han clan. He was raised in the Itaewon neighborhood of Seoul, where many foreigners in South Korea reside. Growing up in Seoul, Han faced racial discrimination as a biracial child and has publicly spoken up about his experiences.

Career
A modeling agency discovered Han via his Instagram at age 15 while he was still in school. They arranged a meeting and met at a coffee shop where they asked him to walk and signed him on the spot. He quickly became one of Korea's most in-demand models and was named one of TIME Magazine’s 30 most influential teens.

In June 2022, Han signed a contract with Sublime.

Filmography

Film

Music Videos

Television series

Variety Show

References

External links 
 

2001 births
Living people
South Korean people of Nigerian descent
South Korean male models
People from Seoul